Simon Dahl (born February 6, 1975 in Skövde) is a beach volleyball player from Sweden, who competed in two consecutive Summer Olympics for his native country, starting in 2000. In both tournaments he teamed up with Björn Berg. He's a resident of Stockholm.

Playing Partners
 Björn Berg
 Stefan Gunnarsson

References

1975 births
Living people
Beach volleyball players at the 2000 Summer Olympics
Beach volleyball players at the 2004 Summer Olympics
Swedish beach volleyball players
Olympic beach volleyball players of Sweden
People from Skövde Municipality
Sportspeople from Västra Götaland County